IFrame may refer to:

 iframe, an HTML element 
 I-frame, a type of video frame in video compression
 "I-Frames", a shorthand term used to reference the video game term of invincibility frames
 iFrame (video format), a digital video format developed by Apple